The Center for Sex Positive Culture (CSPC), formerly known as The Wet Spot, is a non-profit, membership-based organization located in Seattle, Washington. It organizes events and provides space for several different sex-positive subcultures, notably BDSM, swinging, and polyamory groups. CSPC welcomes people of all sexual identities and seeks to encompass all consensual sexual practices. The Center is a 501(c)(7) recreational club; its sister organization, the Foundation for Sex Positive Culture (renamed Pan-Eros in 2018) is a 501(c)(3) charitable/educational organization.

The organization held its first event, a fundraiser, in March 1999.

Mission and vision 

The mission statement of the Center for Sex Positive Culture:
The Center for Sex Positive Culture encourages the exploration and celebration of the many facets of human sexuality. Through an encompassing variety of events, created by and for its membership, the CSPC seeks to educate, to facilitate consensual open sexual expression and dialog, and to provide a venue for fellowship and community.

The vision statement of the Center for Sex Positive Culture:
As proponents of sex positive culture, we believe that the appropriate uses of sex extend beyond reproduction. They include creating personal pleasure, bonding interpersonal relationships, promoting spiritual growth, and enhancing emotional and physical health. In a sex positive world, everyone has the freedom and resources to pursue a fulfilling and empowering sex life.

Membership and activities 
The CSPC's primary location is at Gallery Erato, a building in downtown Seattle. The building is operated by Pan-Eros, and is used by the CSPC on a per-event basis. Membership is open to anyone over the age of 18 who has attended an orientation class and agrees to the organization's rules of conduct. There is also an annual membership fee. Volunteers organize and run most events.

There are many different on-site and on-line events that occur on a monthly basis.  "Offerings include BDSM focused events, sex and sensual touch focused events, bondage focused events, fetish and fantasy focused events, art focused events, socially focused events, and events specifically for new members."

The same physical space is used in various configurations for different events. Some have only tables and chairs, other prominently feature dungeon equipment with an adjoining social area, plus private spaces for those who wish to avoid voyeurs.

Annual events organized by the CSPC or Pan-Eros include:
 The Seattle Erotic Art Festival.
 Seduction, a SEAF fundraiser gala Halloween party.

History 
Founded in 1999 as the Seattle Sex Positive Community Center. Socially speaking, it is an outgrowth of Allena Gabosch's Beyond the Edge Cafe, which hosted BDSM related events. Several regulars of the cafe started discussing getting a dedicated space for their activities. One famously quoted "It would be great if we could get 200 members." In fact the idea became more popular than they envisioned; in its first year The Wet Spot registered about 2,000 members. In September 2007, they reached 10,000 registered members, although not all of them are current members. In 2007 the organization also changed its name to the Center for Sex Positive Culture and opened a second, "annex" building.

In November 2008 the Center for Sex Positive Culture was scrutinized in a KOMO-TV report regarding the Center's non-profit status, and the sexual activities which occur there.  The story was criticized by Dan Savage and others for inaccuracies, and was later pulled from the station's website.

Building problems with new space, shutdown and acquisition of a new space 
The Center lost its long term home in late 2016 when the building they were in was sold to developers, and rebuilt as a commercial storage facility. The Center was supposed to open in a new building at 1514 NW 46th Street, in the Ballard section of Seattle in the summer of 2017. However, the new space fell through due to unexpected major seismic upgrades required by the City of Seattle. In April 2018 the Foundation announced a name change to The Pan Eros Foundation and that a new home location for both the Foundation and the Center had been acquired.

In the new space at Gallery Erato, The CSPC regrouped under the leadership of a new board, and started organizing events again, though at a lower frequency than the original location in Ballard. At the start of the COVID-19 global pandemic, both CSPC and Pan-Eros were required to cease in-person operations as of March 2020, which also led to the cancellation of that year's Seattle Erotic Arts Festival. Both organizations pivoted to online events, and in the middle of 2021, resumed some events with limited capacity and protective-measures in place.

References

External links 

Seattle Erotic Arts Festival

1999 establishments in Washington (state)
BDSM organizations
Human sexuality organizations
LGBT organizations in the United States
Non-profit organizations based in Seattle
Polyamory
Sex positivism
Swinging (sexual practice)
Washington (state) culture